Aris Papazoglou (30 November 1938 – 13 August 1969) was a Greek football striker.

References

1938 births
1969 deaths
Greek footballers
Olympiacos F.C. players
Association football forwards
Greece international footballers
Footballers from Piraeus